The Badain Jaran Desert is a desert in China which spans the provinces of Gansu, Ningxia and Inner Mongolia. By size it is the third largest desert in China.

Its tallest dune is also measured, from base to peak, as the world's third tallest dune and highest stationary dune in the world.

The desert also features over 100 spring-fed lakes that lie between the dunes, some of which are fresh water while others are extremely saline.  These lakes give the desert its name which is Mongolian for "mysterious lakes". These lakes are not completely studied and high pH lakes harbor extremely interesting animal communities. It is also crossed by one river, the Ruo Shui ("weak water"), which has formed an alluvial plain in the desert.

Geography
It is bound to the north by the Gobi and to the East by Mount Lang which separates it from the Ulan Buh Desert (Pinyin: wū lán bù hé shā mò Chinese: 乌兰布和沙漠)

Although most of the dunes in the desert are not stationary, the larger ones usually ranging above  are static. With these dunes only the shallow surface of the sand is constantly shifting. The middle and lower layers of the highest dunes have been compacted for more than 20,000 years causing the sand particles to harden resulting in solid layers of sand and sandstone. High moisture levels inside the dunes also contribute to maintain their fixed state. This rigid structure also allows peaks, cliffs, gullies and even caves to form as a result of water erosion and desertification.

The Badain Jaran Desert, like the Tengger Desert which lies to the east (and with which the Badain Jaran Desert is currently merging due to extensive desertification) is about one-half barren, sandy desert and one-half a mixture of solid bedrock and loose gravel. Several small lakes and oases scatter the desert around which limited vegetation is able to grow.

Lakes
The Badain Jaran Desert is well known for its numerous scattered and colorful lakes. Containing more than 140 lakes they are mainly found in the southern region in the desert. These lakes can easily be found in the larger valleys between large dunes. They are believed to provide the life sustenance in the desert supporting camels, goats and horses which are herded by nomads that travel through the desert. Most lakes also support a green ring of vegetation that populate the close vicinity around the lakes.

Throughout the desert some lakes change color due to large populations of algae, Brine shrimp and mineral formations at different times in year. Evaporation can also allow others to turn into a hypersaline lake forming a salt crust around the rim of the lake.

Although their true sources are still debated it is believed that they are being maintained by underground water streams. Most arid deserts in China are surrounded by mountains that provide water sources, and this is the case with the Badain Jaran Desert. Runoff from the mountains is then collected through gravel deposits and this allows them to run through the desert, providing water sources for the scattered oases.

Within the desert there can be two main types of lakes found regarding their morphometry. The largely elongated shallow lakes mainly appear in the megadune area in the southeastern margin of the desert. The oval-shaped, deep lakes can also be found in the compound transverse megadune area. The lake water can be extremely saline.

Singing Dunes
The Badain Jaran megadunes is one of the few places where a phenomenon known as the "singing sand dunes", "whistling sands" or "booming dunes", in which the sand emits a sharp, loud noise that can be maintained for more than a minute. Although it is not fully understood, it is believed that it is caused by an electrostatic charge that is generated as wind pulls the top layers of sand down a dune slope. This will produce a low pitched rumble that can reach over 105 decibels. The "singing" starts with an avalanche of sand down the leeward face of a large dune. This phenomenon requires very specific circumstances to generate the sound. The dunes are silent throughout winter when humidity is retained in the sand. In the summer, when the sand is dry, the booming can be generated, but only on a slope of at least 30 degrees or more, on the leeward face of a dune; the same sand on the shallow, windward side cannot generate any noise. This phenomenon is only shared by around 35 other beaches and deserts around the world.

Under the same circumstances, it is also possible to generate another acoustic phenomenon. Moving a hand gently through the dry sand of a "booming sand dune" will shear the upper layer of sand off the slope and generate a burping sound emission (pulse-like, short bursts of sound).

Dunes
The Badain Jaran Desert is made up of hundreds of dunes ranging from small to large. Out of all the megadunes, the Bilutu Peak ("bì lǔ tú fēng") is the most famous. Unlike most of the smaller dunes the Bilutu Peak is stationary which makes it the world's tallest stationary dune.

While the larger megadunes are stationary (with only the top layer of sand shifting), the smaller dunes are constantly shifting according to wind patterns. This makes desertification a problem in surrounding areas as the desert is constantly expanding.

Climate
For tourists willing to go more out of their way, the Badain Jaran Desert is definitely a popular tourist attraction. Based upon weather patterns, temperature and sight-seeing possibilities the best time to visit is between June and October. Since the Badain Jaran Desert falls under temperate arid and extremely arid climatic zones, it is important to be prepared when traveling through the dunes. The average annual rainfall is only between 50-60mm and is mainly centered between June to August, however the evaporation of precipitation is between 40 and 80 times than that of rainfall. Besides the fact that it is much colder, winter and spring have very strong winds coming mainly from the northwest getting to more than 60 days long. These winds can even get up to wind force 8. Due to these aspects of the desert climate, the popular tourist time is based upon when the climate is most comfortable. Appropriate foot wear should be worn due to the fact that sand temperatures can exceed 80 °C.

Tourist attractions

Badain Jaran Temple

The Badain Jaran Temple (bā dān jí lín miào 巴丹吉林庙) is a well-preserved Tibetan-Buddhist temple located in the middle of the desert. It was built in 1868 at the side of a lake. Its isolation allowed it to survive untouched and safe from the Cultural Revolution. The fine state of preservation allows visitors to explore the temples attractions including statues, wood carvings, artifacts and a small white pagoda.

The temple is only accessible by land. Visitors normally reach it by renting a sand jeep at the tourist centers located along the S317 highway. Visitors can also chose to hire a driver for a daily fee. The vehicles available for tourists are 4X4 military jeeps with reinforced frames and deflated tires. These jeeps are able to drive through the desert, ascend and descend sand dunes. They remain operational for many hours. These trips by land include several stops at lakes, scenic spots and the Bilutu Peak.

Bilutu Peak

The Bilutu is also a location which is commonly accessed using the sandjeeps. Although the biggest, it is one of several large stationary dunes within the Badain Jaran Desert. Upon reaching the top there will be a clear view of the surrounding dunes as well as several colorful lakes.

Khara Khoto
Also known as the ancient black city, it is located in the northwestern side of the desert near the Ruo Shui River and is located fairly close to the new city of Ejin. The ancient city was a Tangut city founded in 1032 which became the center of the Tangut empire. When Genghis Khan conquered the city it flourished again under Mongol rule. However, the city fell to Chinese armies in 1372 during the Ming dynasty and was left abandoned and in ruins. It has been untouched since. Although not accessible using the same jeeps, it is possible to find transport in the city of Ejin.

Jiabiangou Labor Camp
Between 1957 and 1961, the camp was used for "re-education through labor" to imprison intellectuals and former government officials that were declared to be "rightist" in the Anti-Rightist Movement of the Communist Party. Out of 3,000 prisoners, 2,500 died between 1957 and 1960, during the height of the Great Chinese Famine. The remains of the camp and the unmarked graveyards were poorly maintained and are heavily guarded by the Communist Chinese government. Relatives of the dead are only permitted during the time of Qingming. In November 2013, a memorial dedicated to the dead was quickly destroyed by the local government. Many graves and human remains were also removed since then to prevent people from visiting.

References

Further reading
Basic information and tourist locations
Famous locations and traveling methods of Badain Jaran Desert
A trip adviser blog useful for planning trips
Existing trip plans

Deserts of China
First 100 IUGS Geological Heritage Sites